The  (JFL) is a commercial radio network in Japan. It is owned by J-Wave and established in October 1993.

JFL's main ideal is to respect the operation of each of its affiliates, letting each affiliate flourish under its own terms. The network is a co-operative, with each affiliate offering its resources when useful. So for example when J-Wave wants to air a concert or ask for interviews when a group tours in Nagoya, it can easily borrow the studios of ZIP-FM (the JFL affiliate there) to help produce what's needed.

Japan FM League stations

Current

Former

Programs
 Hot 100

References

External links
 Japan FM League  

Radio in Japan
Mass media in Tokyo
Japanese radio networks
Radio stations established in 1993